Frederick Barton may refer to:

 Fred Barton (composer) (born 1958), American composer and lyricist
 Fred Barton (politician) (1917–1963), British socialist politician
 Frederick Barton (pentathlete) (1900–1993), British pentathlete
 Frederick Otis Barton (1899–1992), American deep-sea diver
 Rick Barton (diplomat) (born 1949), Assistant Secretary for Conflict and Stabilization Operations

See also